The 1953 World Table Tennis Championships men's singles was the 20th edition of the men's singles championship. 

Ferenc Sidó defeated Ivan Andreadis in the final, winning three sets to nil to secure the title.

Results

See also
List of World Table Tennis Championships medalists

References

-